James Kelleher Nestruck (styled as J. Kelly Nestruck) is a Canadian journalist and theatre critic. He is currently the chief theatre critic for The Globe and Mail.

Life and career
Nestruck was born in Winnipeg, Manitoba. He was raised in Montreal. He is bilingual. 

Nestruck began writing for the McGill Daily, one of the student-run newspapers at McGill University in Montreal, while studying drama at the school's English department. He began an internship at the National Post as a reporter in 2003. He moved to feature writing shortly after.

In 2006, Nestruck became a subeditor and writer for The Guardian in London, England.

He returned to Toronto in 2008 to take the role of theatre critic for The Globe and Mail. He is a four-time winner of the Nathan Cohen Award for Excellence in Critical Writing, and in 2013, he was a runner-up for a National Newspaper Award in the Arts and Entertainment category.

He completed a masters at the Centre for Theatre, Drama and Performance Studies at University of Toronto in 2013.

In 2016, Nestruck married playwright and screenwriter Charlotte Corbeil-Coleman.

References

1981 births
Living people
Journalists from Manitoba
People from Winnipeg
McGill University alumni
National Post people
The Globe and Mail people
Canadian theatre critics